By Coincidence, is a 2014 Burmese drama film starring Pyay Ti Oo, Moe Hay Ko and Laila Khan. The film, produced by Sein Htay Film Production premiered in Myanmar on August 29, 2014.

Cast
 Pyay Ti Oo as Dr. Thet Paing Soe
 Moe Hay Ko as Amara Thet (his wife)
 Myat Thu Aung as Sithu Soe (his son)
 Laila Khan as Angela
 Ye Aung as Ko Ko Lwin
 May Thinzar Oo as Ma Wai

References

2014 films
2010s Burmese-language films
Burmese drama films
Films shot in Myanmar